The Bayeux Tapestry (or) is an embroidered cloth nearly  long and  tall that depicts the events leading up to the Norman Conquest of England in 1066, led by William, Duke of Normandy challenging  Harold II, King of England, and culminating in the Battle of Hastings. It is thought to date to the 11th century, within a few years after the battle. It tells the story from the point of view of the conquering Normans but is now widely accepted to have been made in England.

According to Sylvette Lemagnen, conservator of the tapestry, in her 2005 book La Tapisserie de Bayeux:

The cloth consists of 58 scenes, many with Latin tituli, embroidered on linen with coloured woollen yarns. It is likely that it was commissioned by Bishop Odo, William's maternal half-brother, and made in England – not Bayeux – in the 1070s. In 1729, the hanging was rediscovered by scholars at a time when it was being displayed annually in Bayeux Cathedral. The tapestry is now exhibited at the Musée de la Tapisserie de Bayeux in Bayeux, Normandy, France 

The designs on the Bayeux Tapestry are embroidered rather than in a tapestry weave, so it does not meet narrower definitions of a tapestry. Nevertheless, it has always been referred to as a tapestry until recent years when the name "Bayeux Embroidery" has gained ground among certain art historians. It can be seen as a rare example of secular Romanesque art. Only the figures and decoration are embroidered, on a background left plain, which shows the subject very clearly and was necessary to cover large areas.

History

Origins 

The earliest known written reference to the tapestry is a 1476 inventory of Bayeux Cathedral, but its origins have been the subject of much speculation and controversy.

French legend maintained the tapestry was commissioned and created by Queen Matilda, William the Conqueror's wife, and her ladies-in-waiting. However, scholarly analysis in the 20th century concluded it was probably commissioned by William's half-brother, Bishop Odo, who, after the Conquest, became Earl of Kent and, when William was absent in Normandy, regent of England.

The reasons for the Odo commission theory include:
three of the bishop's followers mentioned in the Domesday Book appear on the tapestry;
it was found in Bayeux Cathedral, built by Odo; 
it may have been commissioned at the same time as the cathedral's construction in the 1070s, possibly completed by 1077 in time for display on the cathedral's dedication.

Assuming Odo commissioned the tapestry, it was probably designed and constructed in England by Anglo-Saxon artists (Odo's main power base being by then in Kent); the Latin text contains hints of Anglo-Saxon; other embroideries originate from England at this time; and the vegetable dyes can be found in cloth traditionally woven there. Howard B. Clarke has proposed that the designer of the tapestry was Scolland, the abbot of St Augustine's Abbey in Canterbury, because of his previous position as head of the scriptorium at Mont Saint-Michel (famed for its illumination), his travels to Trajan's Column, and his connections to Wadard and Vital, two individuals identified in the tapestry.  The actual physical work of stitching was most likely undertaken by female needleworkers. Anglo-Saxon needlework of the more detailed type known as Opus Anglicanum was famous across Europe.  It was perhaps commissioned for display in the hall of his palace and then bequeathed to the cathedral he built, following the pattern of the documented but lost hanging of the Anglo-Saxon warrior Byrhtnoth, bequeathed by his widow to Ely Abbey.

Alternative theories exist. Carola Hicks has suggested it could possibly have been commissioned by Edith of Wessex, widow of Edward the Confessor and sister of Harold.  Wolfgang Grape has challenged the consensus that the embroidery is Anglo-Saxon, distinguishing between Anglo-Saxon and other Northern European techniques; Medieval material authority Elizabeth Coatsworth contradicted this: "The attempt to distinguish Anglo-Saxon from other Northern European embroideries before 1100 on the grounds of technique cannot be upheld on the basis of present knowledge." George Beech suggests the tapestry was executed at the Abbey of Saint-Florent de Saumur in the Loire Valley and says the detailed depiction of the Breton campaign argues for additional sources in France. Andrew Bridgeford has suggested that the tapestry was actually of English design and encoded with secret messages meant to undermine Norman rule.

Recorded history 
The first reference to the tapestry is from 1476 when it was listed in an inventory of the treasures of Bayeux Cathedral. It survived the sack of Bayeux by the Huguenots in 1562; and the next certain reference is from 1724. Antoine Lancelot sent a report to the Académie Royale des Inscriptions et Belles-Lettres concerning a sketch he had received about a work concerning William the Conqueror. He had no idea where or what the original was, although he suggested it could have been a tapestry. Despite further enquiries he discovered no more.

The Benedictine scholar Bernard de Montfaucon made more successful investigations and found that the sketch was of a small portion of a tapestry preserved at Bayeux Cathedral. In 1729 and 1730 he published drawings and a detailed description of the complete work in the first two volumes of his Les Monuments de la Monarchie française. The drawings were by Antoine Benoît, one of the ablest draughtsmen of that time.

The tapestry was first briefly noted in English in 1746 by William Stukeley, in his Palaeographia Britannica. The first detailed account in English was written by Smart Lethieullier, who was living in Paris in 1732–3, and was acquainted with Lancelot and de Montfaucon: it was not published, however, until 1767, as an appendix to Andrew Ducarel's Anglo-Norman Antiquities.

During the French Revolution, in 1792, the tapestry was confiscated as public property to be used for covering military wagons. It was rescued from a wagon by a local lawyer who stored it in his house until the troubles were over, whereupon he sent it to the city administrators for safekeeping. After the Terror the Fine Arts Commission, set up to safeguard national treasures in 1803, required it to be removed to Paris for display at the Musée Napoléon. When Napoleon abandoned his planned invasion of Britain the tapestry's propaganda value was lost and it was returned to Bayeux where the council displayed it on a winding apparatus of two cylinders. Despite scholars' concern that the tapestry was becoming damaged the council refused to return it to the cathedral.

In 1816 the Society of Antiquaries of London commissioned its historical draughtsman, Charles Stothard, to visit Bayeux to make an accurate hand-coloured facsimile of the tapestry. His drawings were subsequently engraved by James Basire jr. and published by the Society in 1819–23. Stothard's images are still of value as a record of the tapestry as it was before 19th-century restoration.

By 1842 the tapestry was displayed in a special-purpose room in the Bibliothèque Publique. It required special storage in 1870 with the threatened invasion of Normandy in the Franco-Prussian War and again in 1939–1944 by the Ahnenerbe during the German occupation of France and the Normandy landings. On 27 June 1944 the Gestapo took the tapestry to the Louvre and on 18 August, three days before the Wehrmacht withdrew from Paris, Himmler sent a message (intercepted by Bletchley Park) ordering it to be taken to "a place of safety", thought to be Berlin. It was only on 22 August that the SS attempted to take possession of the tapestry, by which time the Louvre was again in French hands. After the liberation of Paris, on 25 August, the tapestry was again put on public display in the Louvre, and in 1945 it was returned to Bayeux, where it is exhibited at the Musée de la Tapisserie de Bayeux.

Later reputation and history
The inventory listing of 1476 shows that the tapestry was being hung annually in Bayeux Cathedral for the week of the Feast of St John the Baptist; and this was still the case in 1728, although by that time the purpose was merely to air the hanging, which was otherwise stored in a chest. Clearly, the work was being well cared for. In the eighteenth century, the artistry was regarded as crude or even barbarous—red and yellow multi-coloured horses upset some critics. It was thought to be unfinished because the linen was not covered with embroidery. However, its exhibition in the Louvre in 1797 caused a sensation, with Le Moniteur, which normally dealt with foreign affairs, reporting on it on its first two pages. It inspired a popular musical, La Tapisserie de la Reine Mathilde. It was because the tapestry was regarded as an antiquity rather than a work of art that in 1804 it was returned to Bayeux, wherein 1823 one commentator, A. L. Léchaudé d'Anisy, reported that "there is a sort of purity in its primitive forms, especially considering the state of the arts in the eleventh century".

The tapestry was becoming a tourist attraction, with Robert Southey complaining of the need to queue to see the work. In the 1843 Hand-book for Travellers in France by John Murray III, a visit was included on "Recommended Route 26 (Caen to Cherbourg via Bayeux)", and this guidebook led John Ruskin to go there; he would describe the tapestry as "the most interesting thing in its way conceivable". Charles Dickens, however, was not impressed: "It is certainly the work of amateurs; very feeble amateurs at the beginning and very heedless some of them too."

During the Second World War Heinrich Himmler coveted the work, regarding it as "important for our glorious and cultured Germanic history".

In 2018, French President Emmanuel Macron announced that the Bayeux Tapestry would be loaned to Britain for public display. It had been expected to be exhibited at the British Museum in London in 2022, but a date has not yet been finalised. If it does cross the Channel, it will be the first time that it has left France in 950 years, assuming as much evidence suggests that it was made in Canterbury.

Construction, design and technique 

In common with other embroidered hangings of the early medieval period, this piece is conventionally referred to as a "tapestry", although it is not a "true" tapestry in which the design is woven into the cloth in tapestry weave; it is technically an embroidery, although it meets the traditional broader definition of "tapestry" as: "A textile fabric decorated with designs of ornament or pictorial subjects, painted, embroidered, or woven in colours, used for wall hangings, curtains, covers for seats, ..."

The Bayeux tapestry is embroidered in crewel (wool yarn) on a tabby-woven linen ground 68.38 metres long and 0.5 metres wide and using two methods of stitching: outline or stem stitch for lettering and the outlines of figures, and couching or laid work for filling in figures. Nine linen panels, between fourteen and three metres in length, were sewn together after each was embroidered and the joins were disguised with subsequent embroidery. At the first join (start of scene 14) the borders do not line up properly but the technique was improved so that the later joins are practically invisible. The design involved a broad central zone with narrow decorative borders top and bottom. By inspecting the woollen threads behind the linen it is apparent all these aspects were embroidered together at a session and the awkward placing of the tituli is not due to them being added later. Later generations have patched the hanging in numerous places and some of the embroidery (especially in the final scene) has been reworked. The tapestry may well have maintained much of its original appearance—it now compares closely with a careful drawing made in 1730.

The end of the tapestry has been missing from time immemorial and the final titulus "Et fuga verterunt Angli" ("and the English left fleeing") is said to be "entirely spurious", added shortly before 1814 at a time of anti-English sentiment. Musset  speculates the hanging was originally about 1.5 metres longer. At the last section still remaining the embroidery has been almost completely restored but this seems to have been done with at least some regard to the original stitching. The stylised tree is quite unlike any other tree in the tapestry. The start of the tapestry has also been restored but to a much lesser extent.

Norton has reviewed the various measurements of the length of the tapestry itself and of its nine individual linen panels. He has also attempted to estimate the size and architectural design of the 11th-century Bayeux Cathedral. He considers the tapestry would have fitted well if it had been hung along the south, west, and north arcades of the nave and that the scenes it depicts can be correlated with positions of the arcade bays in a way that would have been dramatically satisfying. He agrees with earlier speculation that a final panel is missing—one that shows William's coronation and which he thinks was some three metres long. Norton concludes that the tapestry was definitely designed to be hung in Bayeux Cathedral specifically; that it was designed to appeal to a Norman audience; and that it was probably designed for Bishop Odo so as to be displayed at the dedication of the cathedral in 1077 in the presence of William, Matilda, their sons, and Odo.

The main yarn colours are terracotta or russet, blue-green, dull gold, olive green, and blue, with small amounts of dark blue or black and sage green. Later repairs are worked in light yellow, orange, and light greens. Laid yarns are couched in place with yarn of the same or contrasting colour.

The tapestry's central zone contains most of the action, which sometimes overflows into the borders either for dramatic effect or because depictions would otherwise be very cramped (for example at Edward's death scene). Events take place in a long series of scenes which are generally separated by highly stylised trees. However, the trees are not placed consistently and the greatest scene shift, between Harold's audience with Edward after his return to England and Edward's burial scene, is not marked in any way at all.

The tituli are normally in the central zone but occasionally use the top border. The borders are otherwise mostly purely decorative and only sometimes does the decoration complement the action in the central zone. The decoration consists of birds, beasts, fish and scenes from fables, agriculture, and hunting. There are frequent oblique bands separating the vignettes. There are nude figures, some of corpses from battle, others of a ribald nature. A harrow, a newly invented implement, is depicted (scene 10) and this is the earliest known depiction. The picture of Halley's Comet, which appears in the upper border (scene 32), is the first known picture of this comet.

In 1724 a linen backing cloth was sewn on comparatively crudely and, in around the year 1800, large ink numerals were written on the backing which broadly enumerate each scene and which are still commonly used for reference.

Background

Background of the events depicted 
In a series of pictures supported by a written commentary, the tapestry tells the story of the events of 1064–1066 culminating in the Battle of Hastings. The two main protagonists are Harold Godwinson, recently crowned King of England, leading the Anglo-Saxon English, and William, Duke of Normandy, leading a mainly Norman army, sometimes called the companions of William the Conqueror.

William was the illegitimate son of Robert the Magnificent, Duke of Normandy, and Herleva (or Arlette), a tanner's daughter. William became Duke of Normandy at the age of seven and was in control of Normandy by the age of nineteen. His half-brother was Bishop Odo of Bayeux.

King Edward the Confessor, king of England and about sixty years old at the time the tapestry starts its narration, had no children or any clear successor. Edward's mother, Emma of Normandy, was William's great aunt. At that time succession to the English throne was not by primogeniture but was decided jointly by the king and by an assembly of nobility, the Witenagemot.

Harold Godwinson, Earl of Wessex and the most powerful noble in England, was Edward's brother-in-law. The Norman chronicler William of Poitiers reported that Edward had previously determined that William would succeed him on the throne, and Harold had sworn to honour this, and yet later that Harold had claimed Edward, on his deathbed, had made him heir over William. However, other sources, such as Eadmer dispute this claim.

Artistic context 
Tapestry fragments have been found in Scandinavia dating from the ninth century and it is thought that Norman and Anglo-Saxon embroidery developed from this sort of work. Examples are to be found in the grave goods of the Oseberg ship and the Överhogdal tapestries.

A monastic text from Ely, the Liber Eliensis, mentions a woven narrative wall-hanging commemorating the deeds of Byrhtnoth, killed in 991. Wall-hangings were common by the tenth century with English and Norman texts particularly commending the skill of Anglo-Saxon seamstresses. Mural paintings imitating draperies still exist in France and Italy and there are twelfth-century mentions of other wall-hangings in Normandy and France. A poem by Baldric of Dol might even describe the Bayeux Tapestry itself. The Bayeux Tapestry was therefore not unique at the time it was created: rather it is remarkable for being the sole surviving example of medieval narrative needlework.

Content

Events depicted 

The tapestry begins with a panel of Edward the Confessor sending Harold to Normandy.(scene 1) Later Norman sources say that the mission was for Harold to pledge loyalty to William but the tapestry does not suggest any specific purpose. By mischance, Harold arrives at the wrong location in France and is taken prisoner by Guy, Count of Ponthieu.(scene 7) After exchanges of messages borne by mounted messengers, Harold is released to William, who then invites Harold to accompany him on a campaign against Conan II, Duke of Brittany. On the way, just outside the monastery of Mont Saint-Michel, the army becomes mired in quicksand and Harold saves two Norman soldiers.(scene 17) William's army chases Conan from Dol de Bretagne to Rennes, and Conan finally surrenders at Dinan.(scene 20) William gives Harold arms and armour (possibly knighting him) and Harold takes an oath on saintly relics.(scene 23) Although the writing on the tapestry explicitly states an oath is taken there is no clue as to what is being promised.

Harold leaves for home and meets again with the old king Edward, who appears to be remonstrating with him.(scene 25) Harold is in a somewhat submissive posture and seems to be in disgrace. However, possibly deliberately, the king's intentions are not made clear. The scene then shifts by about one year to when Edward has become mortally ill and the tapestry strongly suggests that, on his deathbed, he bequeaths the crown to Harold. What is probably the coronation ceremony is attended by Stigand, whose position as Archbishop of Canterbury was controversial.(scene 31) Stigand is performing a liturgical function, possibly not the crowning itself. The tapestry labels the celebrant as "Stigant Archieps" (Stigand the archbishop) although by that time he had been excommunicated by the papacy who considered his appointment unlawful.

A star with a streaming tail, now known to be Halley's Comet, then appears. At this point, the lower border of the tapestry shows a fleet of ghost-like ships thus hinting at a future invasion.(scene 33) The news of Harold's coronation is taken to Normandy, whereupon we are told that William is ordering a fleet of ships to be built although it is Bishop Odo shown issuing the instructions.(scene 35) The invaders reach England, and land unopposed. William orders his men to find food, and a meal is cooked.(scene 43) A house is burnt by two soldiers, which may indicate some ravaging of the local countryside on the part of the invaders, and underneath, on a smaller scale than the arsonists, a woman holds her boy's hand as she asks for humanity.(scene 47) News is brought to William. The Normans build a motte and bailey at Hastings to defend their position. Messengers are sent between the two armies, and William makes a speech to prepare his army for battle.(scene 51)

The Battle of Hastings was fought on 14 October 1066 less than three weeks after the Battle of Stamford Bridge but the tapestry does not provide this context. The English fight on foot behind a shield wall, whilst the Normans are on horses. Two fallen knights are named as Leofwine and Gyrth, Harold's brothers, but both armies are shown fighting bravely. Bishop Odo brandishes his baton or mace and rallies the Norman troops in battle.(scene 54) To reassure his knights that he is still alive and well, William raises his helmet to show his face. The battle becomes very bloody with troops being slaughtered and dismembered corpses littering the ground. King Harold is killed.(scene 57) This scene can be interpreted in different ways, as the name "Harold" appears above a number of knights, making it difficult to identify which character is Harold, since one character appears with an arrow shot in his head under the name "Harold" while another character is slain by a sword underneath the words "was slain" . The final remaining scene shows unarmoured English troops fleeing the battlefield. The last part of the tapestry is missing; however, it is thought that the story contained only one additional scene.

People depicted 
The following is a list of known persons depicted on the Bayeux Tapestry:

 Ælfgifu
 Archbishop Stigand
 Conan II, Duke of Brittany
 Edith of Wessex
 Edward the Confessor
 Eustace, Count of Boulogne
 Guy, Count of Ponthieu
 Hakon
 Harold, Earl of Wessex

 Leofwine Godwinson
 Odo, Bishop of Bayeux
 Robert the Staller
 Robert, Count of Mortain
 Scolland
 Turold 
 Wadard 
 William, Duke of Normandy 
 Vital

Latin text 

Tituli are included in many scenes to point out names of people and places or to explain briefly the event being depicted. The text is in Latin but at times the style of words and spelling shows an English influence. A dark blue wool, almost black, is mostly used but towards the end of the tapestry other colours are used, sometimes for each word and other times for each letter. The complete text and English translation are displayed beside images of each scene at Bayeux Tapestry tituli.

Unsettled questions 

The depiction of events on the tapestry has raised several questions which remain unsettled.

The identification of Harold II of England in the vignette depicting his death is disputed. Some recent historians disagree with the traditional view that Harold is the figure struck in the eye with an arrow. The view that it is Harold is supported by the fact that the words Harold Rex (King Harold) appear right above the figure's head. However, the arrow is a later addition following a period of repair, as can be seen by comparison with Bernard de Montfaucon's engravings of the tapestry as it was in 1729, in which the arrow is absent (see illustration above). However, needle holes in the linen do suggest that something had originally been in the place of the arrow, though it may have been a lance rather than an arrow. A figure is slain with a sword in the subsequent plate, and the phrase above the figure refers to Harold's death (interfectus est, "he is slain"). This would appear to be more consistent with the labeling used elsewhere in the work. It was common medieval iconography that a perjurer was to die with a weapon through the eye. Therefore, the tapestry might be said to emphasize William's rightful claim to the throne by depicting Harold as an oath breaker. Whether he actually died in this way remains a mystery and is much debated.

There is a panel with what appears to be a clergyman touching or possibly striking a woman's face. No one knows the significance of this scene or the caption above it: ubi unus clericus et Ælfgyva ("where [or in which] a certain cleric and Ælfgyva"), where Ælfgyva is the Latinised spelling of Ælfgifu, a popular Anglo-Saxon woman's name (literally "elf-gift"). The use of the grapheme Æ shows familiarity with English spelling. There are two naked male figures in the border below this figure; the one directly below the figure is in a pose mirroring that of the cleric, squatting and displaying his genitalia (a scene that was frequently censored in historical reproductions). However, similar naked figures appear elsewhere in the lower border where there seems to be no connection at all with the main action. Harold had a younger sister named Ælfgifu (her name is spelt Alveva in the Domesday Book of 1086) who was possibly promised to William by Harold or even betrothed to him, but she died c. 1066, prior to the invasion. Ælfgifu was also the name of the mother of Sweyn Knutsson and Harold Harefoot, past kings of Denmark and England respectively, via Cnut the Great. It has been speculated that this scene, occurring after the meeting of Harold and William, is to remind the contemporary viewers of a scandal that occurred between Ælfgifu of Northampton and Emma of Normandy, Cnut's wives, that eventually led to the crowning of Edward the Confessor, child of Cnut and Emma. 

At least two panels of the tapestry are missing, perhaps even another  in total. This missing area may have depicted William's coronation as King of England.

Historical accuracy 
The Bayeux Tapestry was probably commissioned by the House of Normandy and essentially depicts a Norman viewpoint. However, Harold is shown as brave, and his soldiers are not belittled. Throughout, William is described as dux ("duke"), whereas Harold, also called dux up to his coronation, is subsequently called rex ("king"). The fact that the narrative extensively covers Harold's activities in Normandy (in 1064) indicates that the intention was to show a strong relationship between that expedition and the Norman Conquest starting two years later. It is for this reason that the tapestry is generally seen by modern scholars as an apologia for the Norman Conquest.

The tapestry's narration seems to place stress on Harold's oath to William, although its rationale is not made clear. Norman sources claim that the English succession was being pledged to William, but English sources give varied accounts. Today it is thought that the Norman sources are to be preferred. Both the tapestry and Norman sources name Stigand, the excommunicated archbishop of Canterbury, as the man who crowned Harold, possibly to discredit Harold's kingship; one English source suggests that he was crowned by Ealdred, archbishop of York, and favoured by the papacy, making Harold's position as legitimate king more secure. Contemporary scholarship has not decided the matter, although it is generally thought that Ealdred performed the coronation.

Although political propaganda or personal emphasis may have somewhat distorted the historical accuracy of the story, the Bayeux Tapestry constitutes a visual record of medieval arms, apparel, and other objects unlike any other artifact surviving from this period. There is no attempt at continuity between scenes, either in individuals' appearance or clothing. The knights carry shields, but show no system of hereditary coats of arms—the beginnings of modern heraldic structure were in place, but would not become standard until the middle of the 12th century. It has been noted that the warriors are depicted fighting with bare hands, while other sources indicate the general use of gloves in battle and hunt.

The American historian Stephen D. White, in a study of the tapestry, has "cautioned against reading it as an English or Norman story, showing how the animal fables visible in the borders may instead offer a commentary on the dangers of conflict and the futility of pursuing power".

Replicas and continuations 

A number of replicas of the Bayeux Tapestry have been created.

Through the collaboration of William Morris with textile manufacturer Thomas Wardle, Wardle's wife Elizabeth, who was an accomplished seamstress, embarked on creating a reproduction in 1885. She organised some 37 women in her Leek School of Art Embroidery to collaborate working from a full-scale water-colour facsimile drawing provided by the South Kensington Museum. The full-size replica was finished in 1886 and is now exhibited in Reading Museum in Reading, Berkshire, England. The naked figure in the original tapestry (in the border below the Ælfgyva figure) is depicted wearing a brief garment because the drawing which was worked from was similarly bowdlerised. The replica was digitised and made available online in 2020. 
Ray Dugan of University of Waterloo, Ontario, Canada, completed a stitched replica in 1996. Since its completion, it has been displayed in various museums and galleries in Canada and the United States.
In 2000, a Danish association, Vikingegruppen Lindholm Høje, began making a replica of the Bayeux Tapestry using the original sewing techniques. The replica was completed in June 2014 and went on permanent exhibition at Børglum Abbey in May 2015.
Dr. E. D. Wheeler, former judge and former dean at Oglethorpe University, commissioned a hand-painted, full-size replica of the Bayeux Tapestry completed by Margaret ReVille and donated it to the University of West Georgia in Carrollton in 1994. In 2014, the replica was acquired by the University of North Georgia in Dahlonega.

An approximately half scale mosaic version of the Bayeux Tapestry was formerly on display at Geraldine, New Zealand. It was made up of 1.5 million 7 mm2 pieces of spring steel—off-cuts from patterning disks of knitting machines—and was created by Michael Linton over a period of twenty years from 1979. The work was in 32 sections, and included a hypothetical reconstruction of the missing final section leading up to William the Conqueror's coronation at Westminster Abbey on Christmas Day, 1066.
Jason Welch, a woodcarver from North Creake, Norfolk, England, created a replica of the tapestry between 2011 and 2014 in carved and painted wooden relief on 25 five-foot planks. He undertook the project to help cope with the grief of losing his 18-year-old son.
Mia Hansson, from Skanör, Sweden, living in Wisbech, Isle of Ely, Cambridgeshire, started a reproduction on 13 July 2016.  she had completed 36 metres, saying that she expected to finish in some 5 years. Hansson takes part of her replica out for talk and display events. In September 2020 she published Mia's Bayeux Tapestry Colouring Book, with hand-drawn images from the tapestry.

Other modern artists have attempted to complete the work by creating panels depicting subsequent events up to William's coronation, though the actual content of the missing panels is unknown. In 1997, the embroidery artist Jan Messent completed a reconstruction showing William accepting the surrender of English nobles at Berkhamsted (Beorcham), Hertfordshire, and his coronation. In early 2013, 416 residents of Alderney in the Channel Islands finished a continuation including William's coronation and the building of the Tower of London.

In popular culture 

Because it resembles a modern comic strip or movie storyboard, is widely recognised, and is so distinctive in its artistic style, the Bayeux Tapestry has frequently been used or reimagined in a variety of different popular culture contexts. George Wingfield Digby wrote in 1957:

It has been cited by Scott McCloud in Understanding Comics as an example of early sequential-narrative art; and Bryan Talbot, a British comic book artist, has called it "the first known British comic strip".

It has inspired many modern political and other cartoons, including:
 John Hassall's satirical pastiche Ye Berlyn Tapestrie, published in 1915, which tells the story of the German invasion of Belgium in August 1914
 Rea Irvin's cover for the New Yorker magazine of 15 July 1944 marking D-Day
 George Gale's pastiche chronicling the saga leading up to Britain's entry into the European Economic Community, published across six pages in The Times "Europa" supplement on 1 January 1973

The tapestry has inspired modern embroideries, most notably and directly:
 The Overlord Embroidery (1974), commemorating Operation Overlord and the Normandy landings of 1944, now at Portsmouth
 The Prestonpans Tapestry (2010), which chronicles the events surrounding the Battle of Prestonpans in 1745

Other embroideries more loosely inspired by it include the Hastings Embroidery (1966), the New World Tapestry (1980–2000), the Quaker Tapestry (1981–89), the Great Tapestry of Scotland (2013), the Scottish Diaspora Tapestry (2014–15), Magna Carta (An Embroidery) (2014–15), and (in this case a woven tapestry with embroidered details) the Game of Thrones Tapestry (2017–19).

A number of films have used sections of the tapestry in their opening credits or closing titles, including Disney's Bedknobs and Broomsticks, Anthony Mann's El Cid, Franco Zeffirelli's Hamlet, Frank Cassenti's La Chanson de Roland, Kevin Reynolds' Robin Hood: Prince of Thieves, and Richard Fleischer's The Vikings.

The design and embroidery of the tapestry form one of the narrative strands of Marta Morazzoni's 1988 novella The Invention of Truth.

The tapestry is referred to in Tony Kushner's play Angels in America. The apocryphal account of Queen Matilda's creation of the tapestry is used, perhaps in order to demonstrate that Louis, one of the main characters, holds himself to mythological standards.

In March 2022 the French specialist factual documentary Mysteries of the Bayeux Tapestry was broadcast by BBC Four. The programme explores both the history of the tapestry and the scientific and archaeological stories that lie within its embroidery. The original 90-minute documentary, written by Jonas Rosales, directed by Alexis de Favitski and produced by Antoine Bamas, was cut to 59 minutes for the BBC broadcast. The documentary includes the work of scientists from the Laboratoire d'Archéologie Moléculaire et Structurale (LAMS) at the French National Centre for Scientific Research, using a hyperspectral camera, measuring 215 different colours, to analyse the exact pigments used to produce the original colours for the dyed woollen threads, derived from madder, weld and indigo.

Notes

References

Further reading 

 

 Bernstein, David J. (1986). "The Mystery of Bayeux Tapestry" Weidenfeld and Nicolson 
 Bloch, Howard (2006). A Needle in the Right Hand of God: The Norman Conquest of 1066 and the Making and Meaning of the Bayeux Tapestry. Random House 
 Bridgeford, Andrew (2005). 1066 : the hidden history in the Bayeux Tapestry Walker & Company 
 
 Burt, Richard (2007). "Loose Threads:  Weaving Around Women in the Bayeux Tapestry and Cinema", in Medieval Film, ed. Anke Bernau and Bettina Bildhauer Manchester University Press
 Burt, Richard (Summer 2007). "Re-embroidering the Bayeux Tapestry in Film and Media: the Flip Side of History in Opening and End Title Sequences," special issue of Exemplaria on "Movie Medievalism," 19.2., 327–50, co-edited by Richard Burt.
 Burt, Richard (2009). "Border Skirmishes: Weaving Around the Bayeux Tapestry and Cinema in Robin Hood, Prince of Thieves and El Cid." In Medieval Film. Ed. Anke Bernau and Bettina Bildhauer (Manchester: Manchester UP), pp. 158–18.
 Burt, Richard (2008). Medieval and Early Modern Film and Media (New York and London:  Palgrave Macmillan), xiv; 279 pp. Paperback edition, 2010.
 Campbell, M. W (1984). "Aelfgyva : The Mysterious Lady of the Bayeux Tapestry" Annales de Normandie, V. 34, n. 2, pp. 127–45.
 Foys, Martin K. (2003). Bayeux Tapestry Digital Edition. Individual licence ed; CD-ROM. On-line version, 2013
 Foys, Martin K., Overbey, Karen Eileen Overbey and Terkla, Dan (eds.) (2009) The Bayeux Tapestry: New Interpretations, Boydell and Brewer .
 Gibbs-Smith, C. H. (1973). The Bayeux Tapestry London; New York, Phaidon; Praeger
 
 Jones, Chas (2005). "The Yorkshire Preface to the Bayeux Tapestry" The Events of September 1066 – Depicted In a Community Tapestry, Writers Print Shop, first edition. 
 Pastan, Elizabeth Carson, and Stephen White, with Kate Gilbert (2014). The Bayeux Tapestry and its Contexts: A Reassessment. Boydell Press .
 Rud, Mogens (1992). "The Bayeux Tapestry and the Battle of Hastings 1066", Christian Eilers Publishers, Copenhagen; contains full colour photographs and explanatory text
 Werckmeister, Otto Karl (1976). "The Political Ideology of the Bayeux Tapestry." Studi Medievali, 3rd Series 17, no. 2: 535–95.
 Wilson, David McKenzie (ed.) (2004). The Bayeux Tapestry: the Complete Tapestry in Color, Rev. ed. New York: Thames & Hudson  (1985 ed.). LC NK3049.
 Wissolik, Richard David (1982). "Duke William's Messengers: An Insoluble, Reverse-Order Scene of the Bayeux Tapestry." Medium Ævum. L, 102–07.
 Wissolik, Richard David (March 1979). "The Monk Eadmer as Historian of the Norman Succession: Korner and Freeman Examined." American Benedictine Review, pp. 32–42.
 Wissolik, Richard David. "The Saxon Statement: Code in the Bayeux Tapestry." Annuale Mediævale. 19 (September 1979), 69–97.
 Wissolik, Richard David (1989). The Bayeux Tapestry. A Critical Annotated Bibliography with Cross References and Summary Outlines of Scholarship, 1729–1988, Greensburg: Eadmer Press.

External links 

 
 Bayeux Tapestry – Bayeux Museum
 Digital exploration of the tapestry
 High quality panoramic image of Bayeux Tapestry (Bibliotheca Augustana)
 A Guide to the Bayeux Tapestry – Latin-English translation
 The Bayeux Tapestry – collection of videos, articles and bibliography
  With 16 images

1070s works
Anglo-Saxon art
Bayeux
Cultural depictions of William the Conqueror
Embroidery
Memory of the World Register
Norman conquest of England
Romanesque art
Tapestries
Works about battles and military operations